Green Acres, Nova Scotia  is a residential neighbourhood in Halifax on the Mainland Halifax within the Halifax Regional Municipality Nova Scotia . Not to be confused with Green Acres the Subdivision (land) in Kings County, Nova Scotia in The Annapolis Valley.

References
 Destination Nova Scotia

Communities in Halifax, Nova Scotia